Arthur White may refer to:

 Arthur Silva White (1859–1932), British administrator, geographer and travel author
 Arthur Henry White (1924–2014), American businessman and humanitarian
 Arthur White (American football) (c. 1877–1929), American football coach
 A. Arnim White (1889–1981), American general
 Arthur Kent White (1889–1981), American Pentecostal bishop
 Arthur White (priest) (1880–1961), Archdeacon of Warrington
 Arthur White (Canadian politician) (1907–1973), Canadian politician
 Arthur L. White (1907–1991), Seventh-day Adventist and authority on his grandmother Ellen White
 Arthur White (baseball), American baseball player
 Arthur Henry White (1924–2014), American businessman and humanitarian
 Arthur White (actor) (born 1933), British actor, older brother of actor David Jason
 Artie White (1879–1960), Australian rules footballer
 Artie "Blues Boy" White (1937–2013), American blues musician

See also
Arthur Whyte (1921–2014), Australian politician